Mount Goodsir (or the Goodsir Towers) is the highest mountain in the Ottertail Range, a subrange of the Park Ranges in British Columbia. It is located in Yoho National Park, near its border with Kootenay National Park. The mountain has two major summits, the South Tower (the higher summit) and the North Tower, .

The mountain was named by James Hector in 1859 after two brothers, John Goodsir, a professor of anatomy at the University of Edinburgh, and Harry Goodsir, a surgeon on the ship HMS Erebus.

The standard route on the South Tower is the southwest ridge, a straightforward but long climb (Grade III), which consists primarily of non-technical terrain, but includes short sections of narrow ridge graded YDS 5.4. Access to any route on either Tower requires a long hike.

See also
 Mountain peaks of Canada
 List of mountain peaks of North America
 List of mountain peaks of the Rocky Mountains

References

External links
 

Canadian Rockies
Three-thousanders of British Columbia
Mountains of Yoho National Park
Kootenay Land District